José Raúl Vera López is a Mexican friar of the Dominican Order and since 2000 bishop of the Roman Catholic Diocese of Saltillo. He is known as well for his struggle for human rights and social justice.

Biography

Early life and formation
Vera López was born on 21 June 1945 in Acámbaro.

In 1968 he started his religious training in the novitiate of the Order of Preachers, also known as the Dominican Order, in the Central Mexican city of León. Subsequently he studied philosophy in Mexico City and in theology in Bologna in Italy.

Vera Lopez is an alumnus of the Pontifical University of St. Thomas Aquinas Angelicum where he obtained a licentiate in Sacred Theology with a grade of summa cum laude.  He was ordained priest by Pope Paul VI on 29 June 1975 and consecrated bishop by Pope John Paul II on 6 January 1988.

Episcopal career 
Vera López held several clerical posts, was appointed bishop of the Diocese of Ciudad Altamirano in 1987, coadjutor bishop of the Diocese of San Cristóbal de Las Casas in 1995, and bishop of the Diocese of Saltillo in 1999.

Next to his clerical career, Vera López is an avowed advocate for human rights and social justice. With the risk for his own safety he expressed his views against abuse of power, corruption, absence of the rule of law and violations of human rights. Furthermore, he opposes the fact that, although Mexico is not really a poor country, around half of its 110 million people live below the poverty line.

Recognition 
Vera López was nominated for a Nobel Peace Prize in 2012. He received several recognitions, e.g.:
2000: «Don Sergio Méndez Arceo» National Prize for Human Rights
2000: «Roque Dalton» Medal
2007: Medal of Merit in Mexico City
2009: «Samuel Ruiz» Award
2009: «Hijo predilecto de Acámbaro» Award
2010: Thorolf Rafto Memorial Prize
2013: Doctorate honoris causa in humanities from the Dominican Bayamón Central University in Puerto Rico.

References 

21st-century Roman Catholic bishops in Mexico
Mexican human rights activists
Mexican Dominicans
Dominican bishops
People from Guanajuato
1945 births
Living people